Libra is the debut album by saxophonist Gary Bartz' Quintet, recorded in 1967 and released on the Milestone label.

Reception

Michael G. Nastos of AllMusic wrote: "Featured are excellent compositions and playing in mainstream mode... This is the more lyrical side of Bartz".

Track listing 
All compositions by Gary Bartz except as indicated
 "Eastern Blues" - 3:58
 "Disjunction" - 7:10
 "Cabin in the Sky" (John La Touche, Vernon Duke) - 3:59
 "Air and Fire" - :52
 "Libra" - 6:22
 "Bloomdido" (Charlie Parker) - 4:46
 "Deep River"  (Traditional) - 4:51
 "Freedom One Day"  - 5:06

Personnel 
Gary Bartz - alto saxophone
Jimmy Owens- flugelhorn (tracks 1, 3, 4 & 6-8), trumpet (tracks 2, 5 & 8) 
Albert Dailey - piano
Richard Davis - bass
Billy Higgins - drums

References 

Gary Bartz albums
1968 debut albums
Milestone Records albums
Albums produced by Orrin Keepnews